Rajdevi Temple (Devanagari:राजदेवी मन्दिर) is a Hindu temple and Shakti Peethas in Eastern Nepal. The primary deity is Rajdevi. It is situated in the Rajdevi Tole, Rajbiraj, Saptari and draws Nepali and Indian pilgrims, especially in Bada Dashain. Thousands of goats are sacrificed there during Dashain.

History
The temple holds great historical, cultural and religious significance in the local and neighbouring areas. The statue of the deity Rajdevi was found 1000 years ago and has been kept in the same place. The present structure of the temple was reconstructed in 90's.
This temple is known to be the family temple of the brother of King Janak, King Kushadhwaja. The temple was earlier restore by sens of makwanpur who were descendents of Nanyadeva in around 14th century.

Pilgrimage
Every year, thousands of pilgrims from Nepal, India and other countries visit Rajdevi Temple to worship the Bhagawati. During the festivals of Dashain and Tihar, there is presence of even more worshipers.

References

Hindu temples in Madhesh Province
Durga temples
Buildings and structures in Saptari District